Big Brother 4 is the fourth season of the Croatian reality television series Big Brother that began on 7 September 2007 and ended on 21 December 2007.

The maximum prize was 1.5 million HRK (200 000 EUR).  Every successful weekly task increased the final prize by the same amount.  Producers introduced penalties as a response to criticism of the second season, when they were perceived to be too tolerant of contestants' misbehavior. At the end of the show the prize was 1,005,000 HRK.  Vedran was the winner of the show.
In the fourth season 14 housemates entered the house.

Nominations Table

Notes

 The public were voting for the housemate they want to move to a Secret House.
 This week there were no nominations. The 14 housemates were split into 2 teams and competed in a competition. The winning team would be given immunity and the losing team would be up for eviction. Team one lost the competition.
 Stjepan was fake evicted as he answered the Hot Phone.
 There were public nominations.
 The housemates from the Secret House were automatically up for eviction with the housemates that survived the vote moving back into the main house.
 All housemates, with the exception of Mateja, Stjepan & Vita, are up for nomination. The public will do the nominating and the housemates that receive the most votes being up for eviction.
 Mateja was immune as she is a new housemate in the main house.
 Maja-Paola failed her secret mission so she was nominated by Big Brother.
 Goran and Arsen were not in the "company of chosen" so they were nominated. 
 Vita's votes were refused, and was nominated by big brother because she did not give good reasons for nominations.
 Housemates nominated only one housemate who they think will be in the finals
 Arsen, Martina and Tessa were nominated because they nominated Stjepan, who received the most nominations that round.
 Krešimir and Vedran failed their secret mission so they were nominated by Big Brother.
 All housemates were nominated and the public had 30 minutes to vote for the eviction, that would take place that same evening.
 The public was voting for the winner of the show.

References 
 

2007 Croatian television seasons
Big Brother (Croatian TV series)
Croatia